Perrault is a surname. Notable people with the surname include:

 C. Raymond Perrault, artificial intelligence researcher
 Charles Perrault, (1628–1703) French writer
Charles-Hubert Perrault (1922-2019) Canadian businessman
 Claude Perrault (1613-1688), French architect and scientist, brother of Charles
 Dominique Perrault (born 1953), French architect
 Gilles Perrault, (born 1931) French writer and journalist
 Jacques-Nicolas Perrault (1750–1812), seigneur, businessman and political figure in Lower Canada
 Joël Perrault (born 1983), Canadian ice hockey player
 Joseph-Édouard Perrault (1874–1948), French Canadian politician
 Joseph-Stanislas Perrault (1846-1907), politician, father of Joseph-Édouard
 Joseph-François Perrault (1753–1844), businessman and political figure in Lower Canada
 Joseph-Xavier Perrault (1836–1905), Quebec educator and political figure
 Léon Bazille Perrault (1832–1908), French painter
 Maurice Perrault (1857–1909), Canadian architect, civil engineer, and politician
 Olivier Perrault (1773–1827), seigneur, lawyer, judge and political figure in Lower Canada
 Pascal Perrault (born 1959), French poker player
 Pierre Perrault (1927–1999), film director
 Pierre Perrault (author) (1608–1680), French hydrologist and author
 Ray Perrault (1926–2008), Canadian senator
 Serge Perrault (1920–2014), French ballet dancer and teacher

Fictional characters
 Celeste Perrault, a character in the soap opera Days of our Lives

See also
Perrault (disambiguation)
Perreault (disambiguation)
Perraud (disambiguation)
Perreau (disambiguation)
Perrot (disambiguation)
Perot (disambiguation)